Thea Arnold (December 11, 1882 – January 26, 1966) was a German politician of the  and former member of the German Bundestag.

Life 
Arnold was a member of the German Bundestag for one term from 1949 to 1953.

Literature

References

1882 births
1966 deaths
Members of the Bundestag for North Rhine-Westphalia
Members of the Bundestag 1949–1953